Mitchell Cunningham (born 5 September 1986 in Auckland), known as Mitch Cunningham, is a New Zealand racing driver. He is the younger brother of Indy Lights champion Wade Cunningham.

Mitch drove in Indy Lights in 2008 on a partial schedule of only road course races. He finished 23rd in points starting 8 of the 16 rounds of the championship.

He next competed in the 2008–2009 Toyota Racing Series championship, winning top honours winning three of the six races.

Mitchell currently races in the New Zealand GT3 Porsche Cup. He is also one of New Zealand's most successful kart racers, having attained notable finishes in Japan and Italy. He has four New Zealand Karting Championships to his name.

Career summary

Indy Lights

References

External links

1986 births
Living people
New Zealand racing drivers
Indy Lights drivers
Sportspeople from Auckland
Toyota Racing Series drivers
V8SuperTourer drivers